Sandra Gamarra (born 1972), also known as Sandra Gamarra Heshiki, is a Peruvian artist. 
Her work is included in the collections of the Museum of Modern Art, New York, the Tate Museum, London, and the Museo de Arte Contemporáneo de Lima.

References

1972 births
20th-century Peruvian artists
21st-century Peruvian artists
Living people